Espace Mittelland is a region of Switzerland, encompassing the cantons of Bern, Fribourg, Jura, Neuchâtel and Solothurn. It is one of the NUTS-2 regions of Switzerland.

This same mixed name is used in both official French- and German-language texts.

Notes and references 

Regions of Switzerland